Borbecksch Platt (also called Borbecksch or Borbecker Platt) is a Low German dialect spoken in Essen, Oberhausen and Bottrop, Ruhr Area, North Rhine-Westphalia, Germany.

Borbecksch is one of the variants of the South Westphalian dialects (German Südwestfälisch), which belong to Westphalian (Westfälisch), itself a variant of Low German (Plattdeutsch).
Neighboring dialects are Essensch (in the city of Essen), Waddisch (in Werden) and Mölmsch (in Mülheim).

In fact, the true dialect of Borbecksch is not used anymore except for older people.
Today efforts are made by some groups/associations to protect Borbecksch.

The best known representative of Borbecksch is Hermann Hagedorn.

Lord's Prayer

Other examples

Literature 
 Hermann Hagedorn
 Elisabeth Holte
 Johannes Pesch
 Willi Schlüter
 Hermann Witte
 Josef Witte
 Willi Witte

See also 
 Dutch
 Ruhr Language ("Ruhrdeutsch")
 South Guelderish

References

External links 
 Hermann Hagedorn - „Heeme“ (Borbecksch)
 Willi Schlüter - „Dousend Joe Däll'fken“ (Borbecksch)
 Group "Mitten in Borbeck" (Standard German)

Essen
Oberhausen
Bottrop
Ruhr
German dialects
North Rhine-Westphalia
Languages of Germany